The Rete Adriatica Class 500 (Italian: Gruppo 500), classified after 1905 in the Ferrovie dello Stato Italiane (FS; Italian State Railways) as Class 670 (Italian: Gruppo 670) was an unorthodox and iconic cab forward 4-6-0 (2'C) steam locomotive.

Design and construction
The Class 670 was designed by Eng. Giuseppe Zara of the Rete Adriatica (one of the two major railway companies in Italy at the beginning of the twentieth century); its design was very unorthodox, as the boiler was reversed on the frames, so that the cab and the firebox were leading and supported by the bogie, while the cylinders were at the rear. The compound arrangement was also highly peculiar, as it was the first experiment with the Plancher compound engine: this arrangement meant that there were four cylinders, in which the two high pressure (HP) ones and the two low pressure (LP) ones were paired together respectively on the left-hand and the right-hand side of the boiler, and each pair was served by a single piston valve through a crossed-port arrangement. While simplifying the valve gear, this feature made it difficult to equalize the work done by each pair of cylinders, and this provoked hunting.

The locomotive also had a peculiar arrangement for its tender; the coal was kept near the cab on the left side of the locomotive, while a tender carried either  of water, depending on the series.

The first locomotive, initially classified as RA 3701 (later changed to RA 500), was taken to France and subjected to trials with a dynamometer car loaned by the Chemin de Fer de l'Ouest, which were successful. As a result, the other forty-two were built by Ernesto Breda and the German firm Borsig-Werke.

When in 1905 the railways in Italy were nationalised, the Ferrovie dello Stato initially reclassified the locomotives as Class 690 (FS 69XX), but were ultimately classified as Class 670.

Operations
Nicknamed Mucca (Italian for "cow"), the Class 670 spent its career on the mainline railways of the Po Valley; while quite fast and powerful for its day, the unorthodox shape of the locomotive in the end didn't prove successful, with more orthodox designs (like the FS Class 680) eventually being built. Withdrawals of both the Class 670 and Class 671 locomotives began in the 1930s, and by the end of the decade all the locomotives had been taken out of service; none survived into preservation.

Variants and experiments

Class 671
Between 1919 and 1930 29 Class 670 locomotives were rebuilt with a superheater, and were classified as Class 671.

Franco-Crosti
In 1936 the locomotive 670.030 was rebuilt with a Franco-Crosti boiler. Articulated ducts carried the combustion gases from the main boiler to the preheater (placed on a standard bogie tender), and these passed to a chimney at the end of the tender. Exhaust steam from the cylinders similarly went through articulated ducts to the blastpipe at the rear of the tender, while articulated pipes connected the preheater and main boiler to take water and steam from one to the other. The whole locomotive-tender complex was given a streamlined casing. The locomotive was reclassified FS 672.001 and was subjected to trial runs, which showed a 22 per cent fuel saving compared to other Class 671 locomotives.

Although it paved the way to other, more successful conversions, this locomotive was only meant as a trial essay, and was quickly discarded.

References

Notes

Bibliography

 
 
 

670
4-6-0 locomotives
Breda locomotives
Borsig locomotives
Railway locomotives introduced in 1900
Standard gauge locomotives of Italy
2′C n4v locomotives
Four-cylinder compound steam locomotives
Passenger locomotives 
Scrapped locomotives
Cab forward steam locomotives